José de Jesús López Higuera (born July 3, 1990 in Ahome, Sinaloa) is a Mexican professional footballer who currently plays for Murciélagos F.C.

References

1990 births
Living people
Mexican footballers
People from Ahome Municipality
Association footballers not categorized by position